Ramila angustifimbrialis is a moth in the family Crambidae. It was described by William Warren in 1890. It is found in Taiwan, India, Nepal, Bhutan, Myanmar and Thailand.

Adults are silvery white with a fulvous costa of the forewings.

References

Moths described in 1890
Schoenobiinae